Windhoeker Maschinenfabrik (WMF) is a Namibian defense contractor located in Windhoek, Namibia and operated by the Namibian Defence Force. WMF designs and manufactures monocoque V-hull armoured combat vehicles. WMF is responsible for the armoured bodywork fabrication while engines, transmissions and axles are built by MAN.

History

Windhoeker Maschinenfabrik was founded in 1939. It later provided equipment for the South African Defence Force and South West African Territorial Force. In 1977 WMF began manufacturing Mine Protected Vehicles. After the Independence of Namibia from South Africa in 1989, WMF was nationalized in 1998. The company functions as a subsidiary of Namibian Defence Force. Currently retired Major General Ben Kadhila is the Managing Director.

WMF Products
WMF performs the following services:
 armouring of plant and construction machinery
 Refurbishing of other armoured vehicles such as the Casspir.

WMF produces the following 4x4 Mine protected vehicles (MPVs)
 Wolf I,
 Wolf II,
 Wolf Turbo II - at 14 tons,
 WerWolf Mk I  - at 10 tons.
 Wer’wolf MKII at 17 tons.
 MK III

WMF also produces the following 6x6 Mine protected vehicles (MPVs)
Wolf 6x6 recovery vehicle
WerWolf Mk II 6X6 recovery vehicle

Humanitarian Engineering and Consulting (HEC), the R&D branch for MgM, has designed a special series of WerWolf called the HEC-Wolf, which specifically supports the requirements of Humanitarian Demining operations. The HEC-Wolf is somewhat de-militarized in that it cannot carry the wide range of weapons which normally are associated with this vehicle.

Users
WMFs customers are:
  Namibian Defence Force
 Angolan Armed Forces
 Umbutfo Eswatini Defence Force
 NamPower
 United Nations agencies,
 Humanitarian agencies such as:
 Red Cross
 Doctors Without Borders
 Stiftung Menschen gegen Minen e. V. better known as MgM
 selected filmmakers and TV crews

Location
 Physical address
13 Bessemer Street,

Southern Industrial Area

Windhoek, Namibia

 Postal Address:

P.O. Box 5013

Windhoek, Namibia

See also
 V-hull
 MRAP

References

External links
 Official website
 HEC official webpage
 MgM official website

Military history of Namibia
Vehicle armour
Armoured warfare
Military technology
Military vehicle manufacturers
1939 establishments in South West Africa